Carsten Hennig (born 6 November 1976) is a German former football player. He made his debut on the professional league level in the 2. Bundesliga for Eintracht Frankfurt on 22 September 1996 when he started in a game against Stuttgarter Kickers.

References

1976 births
Living people
German footballers
Eintracht Frankfurt players
Eintracht Frankfurt II players
FSV Frankfurt players
SV Wehen Wiesbaden players
VfR Mannheim players
2. Bundesliga players
Association football defenders